Liesveld  is a hamlet in Molenlanden, which is a municipality in the Dutch province of South Holland. Liesveld is on the southside of the Lek River, between Groot Ammers and Gelkenes.

References 
 Equivalent article on the Dutch Wikipedia.

Populated places in South Holland
Molenlanden